Manilkara bidentata is a species of Manilkara native to a large area of northern South America, Central America and the Caribbean. Common names include bulletwood, balatá, ausubo, massaranduba, quinilla, and (ambiguously) "cow-tree".

Description
The flowers are white, and are produced at the beginning of the rainy season. The fruit is a yellow berry,  in diameter, which is edible; it contains one (occasionally two) seed(s). Its latex is used industrially for products such as chicle.

Uses

The latex is extracted in the same manner in which sap is extracted from the rubber tree. It is then dried to form an inelastic rubber-like material. It is almost identical to gutta-percha (produced from a closely related southeast Asian tree), and is sometimes called gutta-balatá.

Balatá was often used in the production of high-quality golf balls, to use as the outer layer of the ball. Balatá-covered balls have a high spin rate, but do not travel as far as most balls with a Surlyn cover. Due to the nondurable nature of the material the golf club strikes, balatá-covered balls do not last long before needing to be replaced. While once favored by professional and low-handicap players, they are now obsolete, replaced by newer Surlyn and urethane technology.

Today, Brazil is the largest producer of Massaranduba wood, where it is cut in the Amazon rainforest.

The tree is a hardwood with a red heart, which is used for furniture and as a construction material where it grows. Locals often refer to it as bulletwood for its extremely hard wood, which is so dense that it does not float in water. Drilling is necessary to drive nailed connections. In trade, it is occasionally (and incorrectly) called "brazilwood".

The fruit, like that of the related sapodilla (M. zapota), is edible.

Though its heartwood may present in a shade of purple, Manilkara bidentata should not be confused with another tropical tree widely known as "purpleheart", Peltogyne pubescens.

This timber is being used to produce outdoor furniture and is being marketed as "Pacific Jarrah" in Australia.

References

External links
 
 

bidentata
Plants described in 1807
Trees of South America
Natural materials
Organic polymers
Rubber
Elastomers